The National Women's Championship was the highest-tier competition of  women's rugby union in Australia through the 2017 season. It was superseded as the top level of the women's sport by the new Super W competition from the 2018 season forward.

The annual tournament was contested by teams from every state except Tasmania. The Championship also acted as a selection tool for the Australia women's national rugby union team, that competes at the Women's Rugby World Cup.

Teams
The teams that competed for the National Women's Championship, as of 2013, were:
 ACT and Southern New South Wales
 New South Wales Country
 Northern Territory
 Queensland
 South Australia
 Sydney
 Victoria
 Western Australia

Champions
The tournament was contested from 1996 onwards until the 2017 season.

Winners of the National Women's Championship:
1996 Queensland
1997 Queensland
1998 Queensland
1999 New South Wales
2000 New South Wales
2003 Sydney Gold
2004 Sydney White
2005 Sydney Gold
2006 Queensland
2007 Sydney
2008 Sydney
2009 Queensland
2010 Sydney
2011 Queensland
2012 Sydney
2013 Sydney
2014 not held
2015 Sydney
2016 Sydney
2017 Sydney

See also

Australia women's national rugby union team
Australia women's national rugby sevens team
Super W
Women's rugby union in Australia

References

External links
 

Women's rugby union competitions in Australia
Rugby union
2000 establishments in Australia
Sports leagues established in 2000
Women's